Catullus 1 is traditionally arranged first among the poems of the Roman poet Catullus, though it was not necessarily the first poem that he wrote.  It is dedicated to Cornelius Nepos, a historian and minor poet, though some consider Catullus's praise of Cornelius's history of the Italians to have been sarcastic.

The poem alternates between humility and a self-confident manner; Catullus calls his poetry "little" and "trifles", but asks that it remain for more than one age.  This understatement is likely deliberate; Catullus knows very well the quality of his poetry, and also the provocative form it has.  He also calls his work "new"; the poems are recently made and therefore new, but they are also new as some of the first examples of Neoteric poetry in the Latin language.

The meter of this poem is hendecasyllabic, a common form in Catullus's poetry.

Text

Notes
 "To unfold the entire age in three papyrus rolls" can be less literally rendered as "To give an account of all recorded history in three volumes", and refers to Cornelius Nepos' Chronica ("Annals"), an exhaustive three-volume history of the Greco-Roman world.
 O does not appear in any extant manuscripts, but is supplied by modern editors on the assumption that it was in the original, based on context and metrical concerns.
 The "patron maiden" may be either Minerva or one of the Muses.

Bibliography

External links 

 Catullus 1 for Catullus 1 translated into 13 languages.
 Carmina for some of the texts in Latin.
 Catullus 1 translated
 Literal Translation of Catullus 1

C001
Articles containing video clips